Jason "Jay" Larson is an American comedian, actor, and writer. He currently resides in Los Angeles.

Early life 
Larson grew up in Stoneham, Massachusetts. The youngest of four, he was raised by his mother and grandmother. He attended Saint Anselm College and earned a degree in English in 1999. While in college, he played on the baseball team and played the Rabbi during his senior year in the school's production of Fiddler on the Roof. Upon graduation he moved to Los Angeles to be a writer and actor.

Career 
Larson began performing stand-up comedy in Los Angeles in 2001, and in 2004, he became a paid regular at The Comedy Store. The following year, he appeared as one of the featured "New Faces" at the Montreal Comedy Festival.

Larson first appeared on The Late Late Show with Craig Ferguson in 2005 and in 2011 had a half-hour special on Comedy Central. His story "Wrong Number" made the front page of Reddit and was featured on This American Life with Ira Glass in 2016. In 2015, Larson appeared on Comedy Central's This Is Not Happening.

From 2012 to 2018 Larson produced the comedy podcast "The CrabFeast" together with comedian Ryan Sickler.

Larson co-hosted two seasons of Esquire Network's Best Bars in America, produced in 2014. In the spring of 2015, Larson appeared in the thriller film The Invitation. The Karyn Kusama-directed film led to a role as a limo driver in the third season of Twin Peaks on Showtime in 2017. Larson has also created two television shows for NBC Universal that were not picked up.

Discography
 Self Diagnosed (2011)
 Human Math (2016)
 Me Being Me (2018)

Personal life 
Larson currently resides in Los Angeles.

External links
 The CrabFeast podcast website
 IMDB page: list of television and film appearances

References

American stand-up comedians
Living people
21st-century American male actors
Saint Anselm College alumni
Saint Anselm Hawks baseball players
21st-century American comedians
Year of birth missing (living people)